Pulaski may refer to:

Places
 Pulaski Heights, a section of the city of Little Rock, Arkansas
 Pulaski Shoal, an underwater landform west of the Florida Keys
 Pulaski, Georgia, a town
 Pulaski Square, one of the "Squares of Savannah" in the US state of Georgia
 Pulaski State Prison, a prison facility operated by the US State of Georgia
 Pulaski Tunnel, a historic site related to a 1910 forest fire in the northern panhandle of the U.S. state of Idaho
 Pulaski, Indiana, an unincorporated community
 Pulaski, Illinois, a village
 Pulaski Road (Chicago), major north-south street in the city of Chicago, Illinois, USA
 Mount Pulaski, Illinois 
 Jasper-Pulaski Fish and Wildlife Area, a hunting & fishing wildlife area administered by the US state of Indiana
 Pulaski, Iowa 
 Lake Pulaski, a lake in Minnesota
 Pulaski, Mississippi
 Pulaski, Missouri
 Pulaski, New York
 Pulaski, Ohio, a census-designated place
 Pulaskiville, Ohio, a census-designated place
 Pulaski, Tennessee
 Pulaski, Virginia
 Pulaski, Wisconsin, a village
 Pulaski, Iowa County, Wisconsin, a town

American infrastructure and landmarks 
 Pulaski Technical College, a college in Arkansas
 U.S. Route 40 in Delaware or Pulaski Highway
 Fort Pulaski, on Cockspur Island, Georgia 
 Pulaski Road (Chicago), Illinois
 Casimir Pulaski Memorial Highway, the portion of Interstate 65 in Lake County, Indiana 
 U.S. Route 40 in Maryland or Pulaski Highway
 Pulaski Expressway, a never-built expressway in Pennsylvania
 General Pulaski Skyway, New Jersey
 Pulaski Bridge, New York City
 County Route 11 (Suffolk County, New York) or Pulaski Road
 Pulaski Barracks, a U.S. Army military installation in Kaiserslautern, Germany

Ships
 SS Pułaski, an ocean liner for the Polish-owned Gdynia America Line
 USS Pulaski (1854)
 SS Pulaski, a steamship sunk off Cape Hatteras in 1838
 USCGC Pulaski (WSC-149), a patrol vessel built in 1927
 USS Casimir Pulaski (SSBN-633)
 USS Pulaski County (LST-1088)

Transportation

Pulaski station (CTA Orange Line)
Pulaski station (CTA Blue Line)
Pulaski station (CTA Green Line)
Pulaski station (CTA Pink Line)

Other uses 
 Pulaski (tool), a firefighting hand tool combining an ax and a mattock
 Pulaski (TV series), a 1987 BBC TV series
 "Pulaski", a 1987 instrumental song by The Shadows and theme from the BBC TV series
 "Pulaski", a 2011 song by Drive-By Truckers from Go-Go Boots
 Pulaski Blue Jays, a minor-league American baseball team based in Pulaski, Virginia

People with the surname 
 Casimir Pulaski, Polish soldier and nobleman, "the father of American cavalry"
 Ed Pulaski, U.S. Forest Service member
 Józef Pułaski, a Polish noble and joint creator of the Bar Confederation, father of Casimir

Fictional
 Apollo (comics) or Andrew Pulaski, a comic book superhero
 Eddie Pulaski, a character in Grand Theft Auto: San Andreas
 Katherine Pulaski, a character in Star Trek: The Next Generation
 Ronette Pulaski, a character from the Twin Peaks TV series and movie

See also
 Pulaski County (disambiguation)
 Pulaski Middle School (disambiguation)
 Pulaski Township (disambiguation)
 Pulaski Park (disambiguation), multiple locations
 Pulaskifield, Missouri, an unincorporated community
 Pulawski (disambiguation)
 ORP Generał Kazimierz Pułaski, a Polish Navy frigate 

Lists of people by surname